Josephine Sticker (July 7, 1894 – September 10, 1963) was an Austrian freestyle swimmer, born in Vienna, who competed in the 1912 Summer Olympics.

She won the bronze medal in the 4×100 metre freestyle relay event, becoming the first Austrian woman to win an Olympic medal together with her teammates Margarete Adler, Klara Milch and Berta Zahourek. Sticker also participated in the 100 metre freestyle competition, but was eliminated in the first round.

See also
List of select Jewish swimmers

References

External links
Profile at jewsinsports.org

1894 births
1963 deaths
Swimmers from Vienna
Austrian female freestyle swimmers
Olympic swimmers of Austria
Swimmers at the 1912 Summer Olympics
Olympic bronze medalists for Austria
Olympic bronze medalists in swimming
Medalists at the 1912 Summer Olympics
Austrian Jews
Jewish swimmers